Proto-Indo-European nominals include nouns, adjectives, and pronouns. Their grammatical forms and meanings have been reconstructed by modern linguists, based on similarities found across all Indo-European languages. This article discusses nouns and adjectives; Proto-Indo-European pronouns are treated elsewhere.

The Proto-Indo-European language (PIE) had eight or nine cases, three numbers (singular, dual and plural) and probably originally two genders (animate and neuter), with the animate later splitting into the masculine and the feminine.

Nominals fell into multiple different declensions. Most of them had word stems ending in a consonant (called athematic stems) and exhibited a complex pattern of accent shifts and/or vowel changes (ablaut) among the different cases.

Two declensions ended in a vowel and are called thematic; they were more regular and became more common during the history of PIE and its older daughter languages.

PIE very frequently derived nominals from verbs. Just as English giver and gift are ultimately related to the verb give,  'giver' and  'gift' are derived from  'to give', but the practice was much more common in PIE. For example,  'foot' was derived from  'to tread', and  'house' from  'to build'.

Morphology
The basic structure of Proto-Indo-European nouns and adjectives was the same as that of PIE verbs. A lexical word (as would appear in a dictionary) was formed by adding a suffix onto a root to form a stem. The word was then inflected by adding an ending to the stem.

The root indicates a basic concept, often a verb (e.g.  'give'), while the stem carries a more specific nominal meaning based on the combination of root and suffix (e.g.  'giver',  'gift'). Some stems cannot clearly be broken up into root and suffix altogether, as in  'bear'.

The ending carries grammatical information, including case, number, and gender. Gender is an inherent property of a noun but is part of the inflection of an adjective, because it must agree with the gender of the noun it modifies.

Thus, the general morphological form of such words is :

The process of forming a lexical stem from a root is known in general as derivational morphology, while the process of inflecting that stem is known as inflectional morphology. As in other languages, the possible suffixes that can be added to a given root, and the meaning that results, are not entirely predictable, while the process of inflection is largely predictable in both form and meaning.

Variation in the position of the accent likewise occurred in both derivation and inflection, and is often considered part of the ablaut system (which is described in more detail below).

For example, the nominative form  'lake' (composed of the root  in the ablaut form , the suffix in the form  and the ending in the form ) had the genitive  (root form , suffix  and ending ). In this word, the nominative has the ablaut vowels  while the genitive has the ablaut vowels  — i.e. all three components have different ablaut vowels, and the stress position has also moved.

A large number of different patterns of ablaut variation existed; speakers had to both learn the ablaut patterns and memorize which pattern went with which word. There was a certain regularity of which patterns occurred with which suffixes and formations, but with many exceptions.

Already by late PIE times, this system was extensively simplified, and daughter languages show a steady trend towards more and more regularization and simplification.

Far more simplification occurred in the late PIE nominal system than in the verbal system, where the original PIE ablaut variations were maintained essentially intact well into the recorded history of conservative daughter languages such as Sanskrit and Ancient Greek, as well as in the Germanic languages (in the form of strong verbs).

Root nouns
PIE also had a class of monosyllabic root nouns which lack a suffix, the ending being directly added to the root (as in  'house', derived from  'build'). These nouns can also be interpreted as having a zero suffix or one without a phonetic body.

Verbal stems have corresponding morphological features, the root present and the root aorist.

Complex nominals
Not all nominals fit the basic  pattern. Some were formed with additional prefixes. An example is  'nest', derived from the verbal root  'sit' by adding a local prefix and thus meaning "where [the bird] sits down" or the like.

A special kind of prefixation, called reduplication, uses the first part of the root plus a vowel as a prefix. For example,  'turn' gives  'wheel', and  'brown' gives  'beaver'. This type of derivation is also found in verbs, mainly to form the perfect.

As with PIE verbs, a distinction is made between primary formations, i.e. words formed directly from a root as described above, and secondary formations, which are formed from existing words (whether primary or secondary themselves).

Athematic and thematic nominals
A fundamental distinction is made between thematic and athematic nominals.

The stem of athematic nominals ends in a consonant. They have the original complex system of accent/ablaut alternations described above and are generally held as more archaic.

Since all roots end in a consonant, all thematic nominals have suffixes ending in a vowel, and none are root nouns. The accent is fixed on the same syllable throughout the inflection.

From the perspective of the daughter languages, a distinction is often made between vowel stems (that is, stems ending in a vowel: i-, u-, (y)ā-, (y)o-stems) and consonantic stems (the rest). However, from the PIE perspective, only the thematic (o-)stems are truly vocalic. Post-PIE ā was actually  in PIE.

Among the most common athematic stems are root stems, i-stems, u-stems, eh₂-stems, n-stems, nt-stems, r-stems and s-stems. Within each of these, numerous subclasses with their own inflectional peculiarities developed by late PIE times.

Grammatical categories
PIE nouns and adjectives (as well as pronouns) are subject to the system of PIE nominal inflection with eight or nine cases: nominative, accusative, vocative, genitive, dative, instrumental, ablative, locative, and possibly a directive or allative.

The so-called strong or direct cases are the nominative and the vocative for all numbers, and the accusative case for singular and dual (and possibly plural as well), and the rest are the weak or oblique cases. This classification is relevant for inflecting the athematic nominals of different accent/ablaut classes.

Number 
Three numbers were distinguished: singular, dual and plural. Many (possibly all) athematic neuter nouns had a special collective form instead of the plural, which inflected with singular endings, but with the ending  in the direct cases, and an amphikinetic accent/ablaut pattern (see below).

Gender 
Late PIE had three genders, traditionally called masculine, feminine and neuter. Gender or noun class is an inherent (lexical) property of each noun; all nouns in a language that has grammatical genders are assigned to one of its classes. Originally, there probably were only an animate (masculine/feminine) and an inanimate (neuter) gender. This view is supported by the existence of certain classes of Latin and Ancient Greek adjectives which inflect only for two sets of endings: one for masculine and feminine, the other for neuter. Further evidence comes from the Anatolian languages such as Hittite which exhibit only the animate and the neuter genders.

The feminine ending is thought to have developed from a collective/abstract suffix  that also gave rise to the neuter collective. The existence of combined collective and abstract grammatical forms can be seen in English words such as youth = "the young people (collective)" or "young age (abstract)".

Remnants of this period exist in (e.g.) the eh₂-stems, ih₂-stems, uh₂-stems and bare h₂-stems, which are found in daughter languages as ā-, ī-, ū- and a-stems, respectively. They originally were the feminine equivalents of the o-stems, i-stems, u-stems and root nouns. Already by late PIE times, however, this system was breaking down.  became generalized as the feminine suffix, and eh₂-stem nouns evolved more and more in the direction of thematic o-stems, with fixed ablaut and accent, increasingly idiosyncratic endings and frequent borrowing of endings from the o-stems. Nonetheless, clear traces of the earlier system are seen especially in Sanskrit, where ī-stems and ū-stems still exist as distinct classes comprising largely feminine nouns. Over time, these stem classes merged with i-stems and u-stems, with frequent crossover of endings.

Grammatical gender correlates only partially with sex, and almost exclusively when it relates to humans and domesticated animals. Even then, those correlations may not be consistent: nouns referring to adult males are usually masculine (e.g father, brother, priest), nouns referring to adult females (e.g. mother, sister, priestess) are usually feminine, but diminutives may be neuter regardless of referent, as in both Greek and German. Gender may have also had a grammatical function, a change of gender within a sentence signaling the end of a noun phrase (a head noun and its agreeing adjectives) and the start of a new one.

An alternative hypothesis to the two-gender view is that Proto-Anatolian inherited a three-gender PIE system, and subsequently Hittite and other Anatolian languages eliminated the feminine by merging it with the masculine.

Case endings
Some endings are difficult to reconstruct and not all authors reconstruct the same sets of endings. For example, the original form of the genitive plural is a particular thorny issue, because different daughter languages appear to reflect different proto-forms. Meanwhile, the dual endings of cases other than the merged nominative/vocative/accusative are often considered impossible to reconstruct because these endings are attested sparsely and diverge radically in different languages.

The following shows three modern mainstream reconstructions. Sihler (1995) remains closest to the data, often reconstructing multiple forms when daughter languages show divergent outcomes. Ringe (2006) is somewhat more speculative, willing to assume analogical changes in some cases to explain divergent outcomes from a single source form. Fortson (2004) is between Sihler and Ringe.

The thematic vowel  ablauts to  only in word-final position in the vocative singular, and before  in the neuter nominative and accusative plural.

†The dative, instrumental and ablative plural endings probably contained a  but are of uncertain structure otherwise. They might also have been of post-PIE date.

In contrast to the other weak cases, it typically has full or lengthened grade of the stem.

An alternative reconstruction is found in Beekes (1995). This reconstruction does not give separate tables for the thematic and athematic endings, assuming that they were originally the same and only differentiated in daughter languages.

Athematic accent/ablaut classes
There is a general consensus as to which nominal accent-ablaut patterns must be reconstructed for Proto-Indo-European. Given that the foundations for the system were laid by a group of scholars (Schindler, Eichner, Rix, and Hoffmann) during the 1964 Erlanger Kolloquium, which discussed the works of Pedersen and Kuiper on nominal accent-ablaut patterns in PIE, the system is sometimes referred to as the Erlangen model.

Early PIE
Early PIE nouns had complex patterns of ablation according to which the root, the stem and the ending all showed ablaut variations. Polysyllabic athematic nominals (type ) exhibit four characteristic patterns, which include accent and ablaut alternations throughout the paradigm between the root, the stem and the ending.

Acrostatic (<  + , i.e. "stationary on the beginning"): The accent stays on the root.
Proterokinetic (<  + , i.e. "moving towards the earlier [i.e. the syllable closer the root]"): The best evidence for the reconstruction of this type comes from ἄγυιᾰ, gen. ἀγυιᾶς 'street' (< ideal *h₂éǵ-u-ih₂- ~ *h₂ǵ-u-yéh₂-) and ὄργυιᾰ gen. ὀργυίᾱς ‘fathom’ (< ideal *h₃réǵ-u-ih₂- ~ *h₃rǵ-u-yéh₂-) in Greek and bé < *gwén-h₂, gen. sg. mná < *gwn-éh₂-s 'woman' in Old Irish.
Hysterokinetic (< , i.e. "moving towards the latter [of the syllables following the root]").
Amphikinetic (< , i.e. "moving towards both sides").

Root nouns (type ) show a similar behavior but with only two patterns.

The patterns called "Narten" are, at least formally, analogous to the Narten presents in verbs, as they alternate between full and lengthened grades.

Notes:
 For the strong cases of proterokinetic nominals, the accent is placed on the penultimate syllable of the stem. If there is only one suffix, the root will be the penultimate syllable; when there is more than one suffix, the penultimate syllable will be a suffix, and the root will appear unaccented and in the zero grade.
 There is an unexpected o-grade of the suffix in the strong cases of polysyllabic amphikinetic nominals. Another unusual property of this class is the locative singular having a stressed e-grade suffix.

The classification of the amphikinetic root nouns is disputed. Since those words have no suffix, they differ from the amphikinetic polysyllables in the strong cases (no o-grade) and in the locative singular (no e-grade suffix). Some scholars prefer to call them amphikinetic and the corresponding polysyllables holokinetic (or holodynamic, from holos = whole).

Some also list mesostatic (meso = middle) and teleutostatic types, with the accent fixed on the suffix and the ending, respectively, but their existence in PIE is disputed. The classes can then be grouped into three static (acrostatic, mesostatic, teleutostatic) and three or four mobile (proterokinetic, hysterokinetic, amphikinetic, holokinetic) paradigms.

"Late PIE"
By late PIE, the above system had been already significantly eroded, with one of the root ablaut grades tending to be extended throughout the paradigm. The erosion is much more extensive in all the daughter languages, with only the oldest stages of most languages showing any root ablaut and typically only in a small number of irregular nouns:
 Vedic Sanskrit dā́ru 'wood', gen. drṓs < PIE 
 Old Irish ben 'woman', gen. mná < PIE 
 Old Avestan zyā̊ 'winter', gen. zimō < PIE 
 Ancient Greek Zdeús 'Zeus', gen. Di(w)ós, Vedic Sanskrit d(i)yāúḥ 'heaven', gen. diváḥ, dyōḥ, both < PIE  'sky, day, god'
 Proto-Germanic reconstructed *tan(þ)s 'tooth' gen. *tundiz < PIE , with the nominative stem preserved in Old Norse tǫnn, Old Saxon tand, Old English tōþ, and the genitive stem in Gothic tundus.
The most extensive remains are in Vedic Sanskrit and Old Avestan (the oldest recorded stages of the oldest Indic and Iranian languages, c. 1700-1300 BC); the younger stages of the same languages already show extensive regularization.

In many cases, a former ablauting paradigm was generalized in the daughter languages but in different ways in each language.

For example, Ancient Greek dóru 'spear' < PIE nominative  'wood, tree' and Old English trēo 'tree' < PIE genitive  reflect different stems of a PIE ablauting paradigm PIE , PIE nominative  and genitive , which is still reflected directly in Vedic Sanskrit nom. dā́ru 'wood', gen. drṓs. Similarly, PIE  can be reconstructed from 'knee' from Ancient Greek gónu and Old English knēo. In that case, there is no extant ablauting paradigm in a single language, but Avestan accusative žnūm and Modern Persian zānū are attested, which strongly implies that Proto-Iranian had an ablauting paradigm. That is quite possible for Avestan as well, but that cannot be certain since the nominative is not extant.

An ablauting paradigm  can also clearly be reconstructed from 'foot', based on Greek pous gen. podós (< ) vs. Latin pēs gen. pedis (< ) vs. Old English fōt (< ), with differing ablaut grades among cognate forms in different languages.

In some cases, ablaut would be expected based on the form (given numerous other examples of ablauting nouns of the same form), but a single ablaut variant is found throughout the paradigm. In such cases, it is often assumed that the noun had showed ablaut in early PIE but was generalized to a single form by late PIE or shortly afterwards.

An example is Greek génus 'chin, jaw', Sanskrit hánus 'jaw', Latin gena 'cheek', Gothic kinnus 'cheek'. All except the Latin form suggest a masculine u-stem with non-ablauting PIE root , but certain irregularities (the position of the accent, the unexpected feminine ā-stem form in Latin, the unexpected Gothic stem kinn- < ǵenw-, the ablaut found in Greek gnáthos 'jaw' < PIE , Lithuanian žándas 'jawbone' < ) suggest an original ablauting neuter noun  in early PIE. It generalized the nominative ablaut in late PIE and switched to the masculine u-stem in the post-PIE period.

Another example is  'night'; an acrostatic root paradigm might be expected based on the form, but the consistent stem  is found throughout the family. With the discovery of Hittite, however, the form /nekʷts/ 'in the evening' was found, which is evidently a genitive; it indicates that early PIE actually had an acrostatic paradigm that was regularized by late PIE but after the separation of Hittite.

Leiden model
Since the scholars who developed it and generally accept it are mostly from the University of Leiden, it is generally dubbed the Leiden model. It states that for earlier PIE, three accent types of inflection of consonant stems are to be reconstructed, and from them, all of the attested types can be derived:

For root nouns, accentuation could have been either static or mobile:

The thematic stem type was a recent innovation, with a thematic vowel *-o- originating from the hysterodynamic genitive singular form of athematic inflection, which had in pre-PIE the function of ergative. That is why there are o-stems but no e-stems and is suggested to be why thematic nouns show no ablaut or accentual mobility in inflection (for other theories on the origin of thematic vowel see Thematic vowel: Origin in nouns). The general points of departure to the Erlangen model are:
Both models share (acro)static and proterodynamic patterns.
The hysterokinetic and amphikinetic patterns are reconstructed only in the Erlangen model.
The hysterodynamic model exists only in the Leiden model and represents an earlier stage of the hysterokinetic and amphikinetic patterns of the Erlangen model. The reconstruction of the paradigm is not based only on internal reconstruction. It is synchronically still attested in the Hittite paradigm of the word for "hand": keššar, kiššeran, kišraš. That is therefore one of the most archaic paradigms in PIE.
The Leiden model describes a stage, Early PIE, that is relatively older than the Erlangen model.
The Leiden model has a one-to-one correlation between the presence of the full grade vowel and the position of the accent, which indicates a historical connection between the two. At the stage of the Leiden model, there was only one phonemic vowel, as *e was always accented, and the new vowel, *o, was always unaccented. Both were therefore in complementary distribution.

Heteroclitic stems
Some athematic noun stems have different final consonants in different cases and are termed heteroclitic stems. An example of such r/n-stems is the acrostatic neuter  'water', genitive .

Derivation
PIE had a number of ways to derive nominals from verbs or from other nominals. These included
 simply adding a nominal ending to a verbal root, e.g.  'house' from  'build',
 accent/ablaut alternations of existing nominals,
 derivational prefixes (including reduplication) and suffixes added to verbal roots or nominal stems,
 and combining lexical morphemes (compounding).

Accent/ablaut alternations
From athematic nouns, derivatives could be created by shifting the accent to the right and thus switching to another accent/ablaut class: acrostatic to proterokinetic or amphikinetic, proterokinetic to amphikinetic or hysterokinetic, etc. Such derivations signified "possessing, associated with". An example is proterokinetic  'sacred formulation' (Vedic bráhmaṇ-), from which amphikinetic  'priest' (Vedic brahmáṇ-) was derived.

Another ablaut alternation is  'horned' from  'horn, roe'. Many PIE adjectives formed this way were subsequently nominalized in daughter languages.

Thematic nominals could also be derived by accent or ablaut changes. Leftward shift of the accent could turn an agentive word into a resultative one, e.g.  'sharp', but  'a slice' (from  'to cut');  'carrier', but  'burden' (from  'carry'). A special type of ablaut alternation was vṛddhi derivation, which typically lengthened a vowel, signifying "of, belonging to, descended from".

Affixation
These are some of the nominal affixes found in Proto-Indo-European

• -o: forms action or agent nouns.

• -u: unproductive suffix of uncertain function. Only used in a few old nouns such as *gón-u (knee) and *dór-u (wood).

• -it: marks elemental foodstuff such as *mél-it (honey), *sép-it (wheat) and *h₂élbʰ-it (barley).

• -men: forms abstractions. This is probably a reduced form of the noun *men-s (mind).

• -ter: forms agentives ("-er").

Compounding
PIE had a number of possibilities to compound nouns. Endocentric or determinative compounds denote subclasses of their head (usually the second part), as in English "smalltalk" or "blackbird". Exocentric or possessive compounds, usually called bahuvrihis, denote something possessing something, as in "Flatfoot = [somebody] having flat feet" or "redthroat = [a bird] with a red throat". This type was much more common in old Indo-European languages; some doubt the existence of determinative compounds in PIE altogether. Compounds consisting of a nominal plus a verb (akin to English "cowherd") were common; those of a verb plus a nominal ("pickpocket"), less so. Other parts of speech also occurred as first part of compounds, such as prepositions, numerals ( from  'three'), other particles (zero grade of  'not', seen in English "un-", Latin "in-", Greek "a(n)-", etc.) and adjectives ( 'tear', literally 'bitter-eye').

Adjectives
Adjectives in PIE generally have the same form as nouns, although when paradigms are gender-specific more than one may be combined to form an adjectival paradigm, which must be declined for gender as well as number and case. The main example of this is the o/eh₂-stem adjectives, which have masculine forms following masculine o-stems, feminine forms following eh₂-stems and neuter forms following neuter o-stems.

Caland-system adjectives

A number of adjectival roots form part of the Caland system, named after Dutch Indologist Willem Caland, who first formulated part of the system. The cognates derived from these roots in different daughter languages often do not agree in formation, but show certain characteristic properties:
Adjectives are formed using zero-ablaut ro-stems, u-stems or nt-stems:  (zero grade of the root ) > Ancient Greek eruthrós 'red';  > *argrós > Ancient Greek argós 'white, bright'.
Adjectives are sometimes formed using i-stems, especially in the first part of a compound: Ancient Greek argi-kéraunos 'with bright lightning'.
There are often corresponding stative verbs in :  > Latin rubeō 'be red'.

Comparison

Comparative
Suffixes *-yos- and *-tero-
A second suffix, originally expressed contrast, as in Ancient Greek pó-tero-s 'which (of two)' or dexi-teró-s 'right (as opposed to left)'. It later attained comparative function. For example, the meaning of Ancient Greek sophṓteros 'wiser, the wiser one' developed from 'the wise one (of the two)'. English far-ther also contains this suffix.

Superlative
Suffixes *-m̥mo- / *-m̥h₂o- and *-isto- / *-isth₂o-
PIE probably expressed the superlative ("biggest, most beautiful") by adding a genitive plural noun to the adjective. Instead of 'the greatest of the gods', people said 'great of (=among) the gods'. They are generalisations of the ordinal numbers.

Sample declensions
The following are example declensions of a number of different types of nouns, based on the reconstruction of Ringe (2006). The last two declensions, the o-stems, are thematic, and all others are athematic. Morpheme boundaries (boundaries between root, suffix, and ending) are given only in the nominative singular.

References
Notes

Citations

Bibliography

 (PB) /  (HB) (alk. paper) /  (EB)

 

Noun
Declension